Cassutt may refer to:

 Michael Cassutt (born 1954), American television producer, screenwriter, and author 
 Cassutt Special, a tiny single-seat racing aircraft

See also 
 Cassutto
 Cassatt (disambiguation)